Dan Gookin is a computer book author who wrote the first ...For Dummies books including DOS for Dummies and PCs for Dummies, establishing the design and voice of the long-running series that followed, incorporating humor and jokes into a format for beginners on any subject. He also is a member of the Coeur d'Alene City Council.

Gookin has written over 150 computer books. His website provides computer help sections and a blog which is updated several times a week. He was editor of ComputorEdge Magazine, a local San Diego computer periodical, from 1987 to 1989.

Gookin lives in Coeur d'Alene, Idaho, where he has been active in community theater and became the artistic director of Lake City Playhouse in 1997. He was elected to a seat in the Coeur d'Alene City Council in November 2011. He was a nominee for the Idaho Senate and the 2007 Libertarian nominee for the Coeur d'Alene city council

He is a graduate of the University of California, San Diego with a Bachelor of Arts in communications/visual arts.

He appeared as himself on the series To Tell the Truth as the panel tried to figure out if he or someone else wrote the first ...For Dummies book.

Bibliography
 C Programming For Dummies (For Dummies, 2020) 
 Android For Dummies (For Dummies, 2020) 
 Dan Gookin's Guide to Curl Programming (Kindle, 2019) 
 Running For Local Office For Dummies (For Dummies, 2019) 
 Android Tablets For Dummies (For Dummies, 2014) 
 Android Phones For Dummies (For Dummies, 2014) 
 Samsung Galaxy Tabs For Dummies (For Dummies, 2013) 
 Beginning Programming with C For Dummies (For Dummies, 2013) 
 Word 2013 For Dummies (For Dummies, 2013) 
 PCs For Dummies (For Dummies, 2013) 
 Laptops For Dummies (For Dummies, 2012) 
 More DOS For Dummies (For Dummies, 1994) 
 DOS For Dummies (For Dummies, 1991)

References

External links
 Dan Gookin's Homepage
 

Living people
American humorists
American libertarians
American technology writers
Year of birth missing (living people)